Lichtenvoorde is a town in the east of the Netherlands, in the municipality of Oost Gelre.

Lichtenvoorde holds a flower parade (bloemencorso) every September at the start of its annual festival. The parade features floats covered in flowers (usually dahlias) in imaginative designs depicting a variety of themes.

Lichtenvoorde has a motorcross circuit on which international grands prix are held.

History
Lichtenvoorde was the name of a municipality that included the town and the villages of Lievelde, Zieuwent, Vragender and Harreveld, until 1 January 2005, when all were merged into the municipality of Oost Gelre.

Its inhabitants are known colloquially as keienslöppers (boulder draggers) due to a historic event. On 15 March 1874, 99 of the town's shoemakers dragged a 20 ton boulder a distance of around four kilometres to the marketplace to serve as a centerpiece for commemoration of King William III's silver jubilee, after 25 years on the country's throne. The boulder remains there to this day, topped by a stone lion holding the town's coat of arms.

Gallery

References

External links
 Website of Oost Gelre

Oost Gelre
Populated places in Gelderland
Former municipalities of Gelderland
Municipalities of the Netherlands disestablished in 2005